Banco Británico de la América del Sud was an extinct British banking institution with headquarters in Buenos Aires, Argentina. It was located in the current corners of Bartolomé Mitre and Reconquista, current site of the Central House of the Banco de la Nación Argentina.

History 

Its central building was located at Calle de la Piedad No. 400, barrio de San Nicolás, Buenos Aires, in front of the headquarters of the Bank of London and South America and Banco de Londres y Río de la Plata. It was built on land belonging to the main families of the colonial period of Buenos Aires.

This institution was originally established under the name Banco Inglés de Rio de Janeiro in 1888, and it was refounded with the name of Banco Británico de la América del Sud in 1891. It had several branches in South America, including Rio de Janeiro and Montevideo.

References 

Defunct banks of Argentina
Banks established in 1888
Economic history of Argentina